Mikhail Alexandrovich (1333 – August 26, 1399) was Grand Prince of Tver and briefly held the title of Grand Prince of Vladimir. He was one of only two Tver princes after 1317 (the other was his father, Aleksandr) to hold the grand princely title, which was almost the exclusive purview of the Muscovite princes.

Mikhail Alexandrovich was the third son of Aleksandr Mikhailovich of Tver. Mikhail grew up in Pskov, where his father had fled after the Tver Uprising of 1327. He was christened by the Archbishop of Novgorod, Vasily Kalika, in 1333.  Five years later, he and his mother were called to Tver when Aleksandr returned to the city.  In 1341, he went to Novgorod where Archbishop Vasily taught him reading and writing (which would have meant reading the Scriptures).  In 1368, he became prince of Tver.

Mikhail Alexandrovich was among the last princes to seriously threaten Grand Duchy of Moscow for possession of the office of Grand Prince of Vladimir, hoping to unseat Moscow with the aid of his brother-in-law Algirdas, Grand Duke of Lithuania. In 1371, he managed to gain the yarlik or patent of office as Grand Prince of Vladimir from the Khan of the Golden Horde, and was accepted as Prince of Novgorod, an important economic asset for any Russian prince. He seems to have lost power the following year when Algirdas concluded Treaty of Lyubutsk with Dmitri Donskoi of Moscow, but it is not clear who was considered grand prince between 1372 and 1375, at which time Dmitri Donskoi defeated Mikhail.

References

1333 births
1399 deaths
People from Pskov
Princes of Tver
Rurik dynasty
Yurievichi family
Eastern Orthodox monarchs
14th-century rulers in Europe